Norsk Allkunnebok is a Norwegian encyclopedia published in ten volumes in Nynorsk language by the publishing house Fonna Forlag from 1948 to 1966.

Principal editor was Arnulv Sudmann.

References

Norwegian encyclopedias
National encyclopedias
1948 non-fiction books
Nynorsk
20th-century encyclopedias